Chiria is a census town in Pashchimi Singhbhum district in the state of Jharkhand, India. India's largest iron ore mine with reserves of 2 billion tonnes of iron ore is located here. The mine is operated by Steel Authority of India Limited.

Geography
Chiria is located at 
. It has an average elevation of 479 metres (1571 feet).

Demographics
 India census, Chiria had a population of 4,178. Males constitute 51% of the population and females 49%. Chiria has an average literacy rate of 57%, lower than the national average of 59.5%; with male literacy of 68% and female literacy of 45%. 15% of the population is under 6 years of age. The local inhabitants are known as Ho people.

References

Iron ore mining in India
Cities and towns in West Singhbhum district